Ghulam Mohiuddin (Punjabi); also spelled Ghulam Mohi-Ud-Din) (born 27 October 1951) is a Pakistani actor of Urdu and Punjabi films. 

One of the country’s most popular film actors during the 70s and the 80s, he has worked in over 400 movies in Urdu and Punjabi during a career spanning nearly 50 years.

He is popularly known as Gullo Bhai in the Pakistan film Industry.

Career
He first worked in film Dil Walay in 1974 and then he worked in film Mera Naam Hai Mohabbat, released in 1975, was a blockbuster in Pakistan and China. The film was inspired by a Chinese folk story. His co-star was Babra Sharif, her first as a heroine.

Since then, he has received several Nigar Awards, Lux Style Awards and a Pride of Performance Award by the President of Pakistan in 2020.

Family
His son Ali Mohiuddin is also an actor, making his film debut in 2016 with Sawal 700 Crore Dollar Ka.

Selected filmography

Television series

Telefilm

Film

Awards and recognition

See also 
 List of Lollywood actors

References

External links
 

1951 births
Living people
Pakistani male film actors
Punjabi people
Nigar Award winners
Recipients of the Pride of Performance
Male actors from Lahore
Male actors in Punjabi cinema
Pakistani male television actors
Male actors in Sindhi cinema
20th-century Pakistani male actors
Male actors in Pashto cinema
21st-century Pakistani male actors
Male actors in Urdu cinema